Ars nova is a late medieval musical stylistic period, centered in France.

Ars nova may also refer to:

Music
Project Ars Nova, a medieval ensemble featuring Crawford Young
Ars Nova Copenhagen, a Danish choir conducted since 2002 by Paul Hillier
Ensemble Ars Nova, a French classical instrumental ensemble led by Philippe Nahon
Ars Nova Singers, Boulder, Colorado
Ars Nova (Polish ensemble), instrumental ensemble of Jacek Urbaniak, collaborating with Collegium Vocale Bydgoszcz
Ars Nova (American band), a classical-rock group, based in New York City, 1967–1969
Ars Nova (Japanese band), a progressive rock band, based in Japan, 1983–present

Others uses
Ars nova (art), the period of painting also known as Early Netherlandish or the Flemish primitives
Ars Nova (theater), an off-Broadway theater
Ars Nova, an alternative name for the magical text Ars Notoria, the fifth book of the grimoire The Lesser Key of Solomon
Arpeggio of Blue Steel -Ars Nova-, a Japanese anime television series adaptation of the manga series Arpeggio of Blue Steel